Howard Ayers (May 21, 1861 in Olympia, Washington - October 1933 in Avondale, Ohio) was an American biologist who served as president of the University of Cincinnati from 1899 to 1904.

Academic career
Ayers graduated from Harvard University in 1883, and from the University of Freiburg in 1885; he also studied at the University of Strasburg and the University of Heidelberg. He then spent a year in the Department of Zoology at the University of Michigan. He also taught zoology at Harvard and Radcliffe College, and ran the Department of Zoology at the University of Missouri. As well, he served as director of Edward Phelps Allis's Lake Laboratory, and as an investigator at the Marine Biological Laboratory.

In 1899, Ayers was recruited to serve as the President of the University of Cincinnati. In January 1900, he fired the majority of the university's faculty.
Philip van Ness Myers, one of the few members of the faculty who Ayers had not fired, called the mass firing a "professional assassination" that "violated every principle of humanity and justice", and resigned. The Journal of Education described it as an example of "autocracy run mad".

In November 1903, the university's Board of Trustees declared Ayers' position vacant, adding that he would remain in office until a replacement could be found. Charles William Dabney was selected to replace Ayers beginning in July 1904; however, due to continued conflict, Ayers was fired in April 1904.

Later that month, William Howard Taft and Horace Lurton recommended that Ayers be chosen to replace Dabney as the President of the University of Tennessee, with Taft sending a letter to the board of trustees on behalf of "Dr. Ayers of Cincinnati"; the board's reply acknowledged that they had received Taft's recommendation of "Dr. Ayres", and they subsequently elected Brown Ayres.

Professional memberships
Ayers was a fellow of the American Association for the Advancement of Science, and a member of the American Society of Naturalists and the American Morphological Society.

Personal life
In 1886, Ayers married Pauline F.A. Shafer. They had seven daughters, including performer Paula Lind Ayers, and one son, who falsified his age so that he could enlist in the US Army when he was 14, but died of pneumonia before he could be sent into combat in the First World War.

References

1861 births
1933 deaths
American biologists
Fellows of the American Association for the Advancement of Science
Presidents of the University of Cincinnati
Harvard University faculty
Radcliffe College faculty
University of Missouri faculty
Harvard University alumni
University of Freiburg alumni
People from Olympia, Washington